Accused is a 1958 dramatized court show consisting of filmed reenactments of actual court cases.  The show was cancelled at the end of its first season.

Background
In the summer of 1957, local television station KABC-TV began broadcasting Traffic Court, presenting re-enactments of traffic court cases and arraignments.  The format proved popular and the show moved to ABC's national daytime schedule.  It was soon followed by the syndicated Divorce Court and Day in Court.  In December 1958, Accused debuted as the prime time version of Day in Court.

Casting
Similar to other courtroom dramas of the time, the defendants and witnesses were actors (including, for example,  Pamela Mason and Robert Culp).  However, the defense and prosecution attorneys were real-life lawyers.  The court was presided over by Edgar Allan Jones, Jr.  Jones had a law degree from the University of Virginia, was a member of the UCLA law faculty and a labor arbitrator.

 Edgar Allan Jones, Jr. as the Judge
 William Gwinn as the Substitute Judge
 Jim Hodson as the Clerk
 Tim Farrell as the Bailiff
 Violet Gillmore as the Court Reporter (and Announcer)

Production
The show was produced by Selig J. Seligman, a former U.S. Army lawyer who served at the Nuremberg Trials.  He later became an ABC Vice President as well as executive producer of Combat! and Garrison's Gorillas.

References

External links

1950s American drama television series
1958 American television series debuts
1959 American television series endings
American Broadcasting Company original programming
Black-and-white American television shows
Dramatized court shows